Nationality words link to articles with information on the nation's poetry or literature (for instance, Irish or France).

Events
 March — Jorge Luis Borges returns to his birthplace, Buenos Aires in Argentina, after a period living with his family in Europe.
 August 3 — Russian poet Nikolay Gumilyov's fate is sealed when he is arrested in the Soviet Union by the Cheka on charges of being a monarchist; on August 24 the Petrograd Cheka decrees execution of all 61 participants of the "Tagantsev Conspiracy", including Gumilyov. The exact dates and locations of their executions and burials are still unknown. He had divorced Russian poet Anna Akhmatova in 1918.
 Autumn–Winter — T. S. Eliot works on The Waste Land in Margate and Lausanne.
 December 31 — Mexican poet Manuel Maples Arce distributes the first Stridentist manifesto, Comprimido estridentista, in the broadsheet Actual n°1 (Mexico City).
 Mrs. C. A. Dawson-Scott founds PEN, an international Association of Poets, Playwrights, Editors, Essayists and Novelists, in London with John Galsworthy, who becomes the organisation's first President; first members include Joseph Conrad, George Bernard Shaw and H. G. Wells

Works published in English

Canada
 Arthur Bourinot, Poems. Toronto: T.H. Best.
 Wilson MacDonald, The Miracle Songs Of Jesus. Toronto: W. MacDonald.

India in Indian poetry in English
 Sri Aurobindo, Love and Death, long poem about the triumph of love over death, concerning the Ruru-Priyumvada legend (somewhat like the Greek Orpheus-Eurydice  and the Indian Satvitri-Satyavan myths)
 Toru Dutt, Life and Letters of Toru Dutt, London, Milford: Oxford University Press, Indian poet, writing in English, published in the United Kingdom
 Maneck B. Pithawalla, A Wedding Feast, Karachi: M. B. Pithawalla* Poets of John Company, Calcutta: Tahcker, Spink and Co., 134 pages; anthology
 K. S. R. Sastry, The Epic of Indian Womanhood, Madras: Imperial Trading Co.
 Puran Singh, The Sisters of the Spinning Wheel and Other Sikh Poems, London: Dent
 Nanikram Vasanmal Thadani, Ashoka and Other Poems, Delhi: self-published

United Kingdom
 Nancy Cunard, Outlaws
 Walter de la Mare, The Veil, and Other Poems
 Toru Dutt, Life and Letters of Toru Dutt, London, Milford: Oxford University Press, Indian poet, writing in English, published in the United Kingdom
 T. S. Eliot, The Metaphysical Poets, critical essay on the Metaphysical poets of the 16th and 17th centuries (text here)
 Robert Graves, The Pier-Glass
 D. H. Lawrence, Tortoises
Bertram Lloyd, ed., The Great Kinship: An Anthology of Humanitarian Poetry
 Charlotte Mew, Saturday Market
 Vita Sackville-West, Orchard and Vineyard
 John Collings Squire, Collected Parodies
 Flora Thompson, Bog-Myrtle and Peat
 W. B. Yeats, Irish author published in the United Kingdom:
 Michael Robartes and the Dancer, includes "The Second Coming" and "A Prayer For My Daughter"
 Four Plays for Dancers, adds "At the Hawk's Well" and "Calvary" to Two Plays for Dancers, published in 1919

United States
 Conrad Aiken, Punch: The Immoratal Liar
 Sherwood Anderson, The Triumph of the Egg
 Hilda Doolittle (H.D.), Hymen
 John Gould Fletcher, Breakers and Granite
 Zona Gale, The Secret Way
 Langston Hughes, "The Negro Speaks of Rivers", in The Crisis
 Amy Lowell, Legends
 Edna St. Vincent Millay, Second April
 Marianne Moore, Poems
 Ezra Pound, Poems 1918–1921, New York
 Charles Reznikoff, A Fourth Group of Verse
 Edward Arlington Robinson, Avon's Harvest
 William Carlos Williams, Sour Grapes
 Yvor Winters, The Immobile Wind
 Elinor Wylie, Nets to Catch the Wind

Other in English
 C. J. Dennis, A Book for Kids (reissued as Roundabout, 1935), Australia
 Lesbia Harford, special issue of Birth (Melbourne, May) devoted to her poetry, Australia
 Patrick Joseph Hartigan, published under the pen name "Joseph O'Brien", Around the Boree Log and Other Verses, very popular Australian book of poetry which went into five editions and 18,000 copies by 1926; widely popularized across eastern Australia by recitations of John Byrne, praised in Ireland and the United States, made into a film in 1925, and 20 poems of the book were set to music in 1933; includes "Said Hanrahan", from which "We'll all be rooned" became an Australian catch phrase
 W. B. Yeats, Irish author published in the United Kingdom:
 Michael Robartes and the Dancer, includes "The Second Coming" and "A Prayer For My Daughter"
 Four Plays for Dancers, adds "At the Hawk's Well" and "Calvary" to Two Plays for Dancers, published in 1919

Works published in other languages

France
 André Breton, Les Champs magnétiques
 Max Jacob, Le Laboratoire central
 Francis Jammes:
 Épitaphes, Paris: Librairie de l'Art catholic
 Le Tombeau de Jean de la Fontaine, Paris: Mercure de France
 Pierre Reverdy, Étoiles peintes
 Paul-Jean Toulet, Les Contrerimes, French

Indian subcontinent
Including all of the British colonies that later became India, Pakistan, Bangladesh, Sri Lanka and Nepal. Listed alphabetically by first name, regardless of surname:

 Amir Minai, Mina-yi, Urdu-language
 Basavaraju Appa Rao, Basavaraju Appa Rao Gitalu,  Telugu-language
 Dimbeshwar Neog, Malika, Assamese-language
 Govindagraj, Vagvaijayanti, 160 poems, including love poems and verses on social and mystic topics; with an introduction by N. C. Kelkar, Marathi-language
 Padmadhar Chaliha, Svaraj Sangit, Indian, Assamese-language
 Vallathol Narayana Menon, Magdalana Mariyam, a Malayalam khanda kavya about a repentant Mary consoled by Christ
 Viswanatha Satyanarayana, Andhra paurusamu, Indian, Telugu-language, written in 1917 but printed in book form this year

Other languages
 Anna Akhmatova, Plantain, Russian
 August Alle, Carmina Barbata, Estonian
 J. C. Bloem, Het verlangen, Dutch
 António Botto, Canções (Songs), Portuguese
 H. Leivick, The Golem, "dramatic poem in eight scenes", Yiddish
 Federico García Lorca, Libro de poemas (Book of Poems), Spain
 Nikolay Gumilyov, The Pillar of Fire, Russian
 Alexander Lernet-Holenia, Pastorale Austria
 Bernardo Ortiz de Montellano, Avidez, Mexico
 Carlos Pellicer, Colores en el mar (Colors in the Sea), Mexico
 Ramón López Velarde, La suave patria, Mexico

Births
Death years link to the corresponding "[year] in poetry" article (Indian poets listed by first name, when listed alphabetically, whether or not it is a surname):
 January 7 – Chester Kallman (died 1975), American poet, librettist and translator best known for collaborations with Igor Stravinsky
 January 15 – Raymond Souster (died 2012), Canadian poet
 January 31 – Kurt Marti (died 2017), Swiss theologian and poet
 March 1 – Richard Wilbur (died 2017), American poet
 April 6 – Marie Ponsot (died 2019), née Birmingham, American poet, literary critic, essayist, teacher and translator
 April 13 – Max Harris (died 1995), Australian poet, critic, columnist, commentator, publisher and bookseller
 April 24  – Gabriel Okara (died 2019), Nigerian poet and novelist
 May 9:
 Daniel Berrigan (died 2016), American Jesuit priest, poet and anti-war activist
 Mona Van Duyn (died 2004), American poet
 June 14 – John Bradburne (killed 1979), English poet and missionary
 June 15 – James Emanuel (died 2013), African-American poet and scholar
June 27 – Lex Banning (died 1965), Australian poet born with cerebral palsy and unable to speak clearly or to write with a pen
 June 29 – vasko Popa (died 1991), Serbian poet
 July 5 – Nanos Valaoritis (died 2019), Greek poet, novelist and playwright
 August 14 – Julia Hartwig (died 2017), Polish poet
 August 16 – Shiv K. Kumar (died 2017), Indian, English-language poet, playwright and fiction writer
 August 18 – Frédéric Jacques Temple (died 2020), French poet and writer
 August 21 – Devarakonda Balagangadhara Tilak (died 1966), Telugu-language poet and story writer
 August 31 – Hayden Carruth (died 2008), American poet and literary critic
 September 2 – Shukrullo (died 2020), Uzbek poet
 October 9 – Tadeusz Różewicz (died 2014), Polish poet, dramatist and writer
 October 13 – Dimitris Tsaloumas (died 2016), Greek-born Australian poet, resident in Australia from 1952
 October 17 – George Mackay Brown (died 1996), Scottish poet, author and dramatist
 December 25 – Nan McDonald (died 1974), Australian poet and editor
 December 26 – Adebayo Faleti (died 2017), Nigerian poet, journalist, playwright, actor, broadcaster and translator
 Also:
 Divya Prabha Bharali, Indian, Assamese-language poet; a woman
 Kathan Singh Jamal, Indian, Dogri-Pahadi-language poet
 Khizar Maghribi, Indian writer of parodies and humorous verse in the Kashmiri language
 Mangalacharan Chattopadhyay, Indian, Bengali-language Marxist poet
 Parsram Rohra (died 1981), Indian, Sindhi-language
 Ramkrishna Sharma (died 1986), Indian, Nepali-language critic, essayist, poet and short-story writer called the father of modern literary criticism in Nepali
 Rasananda Sahu, Indian, Oriya poet and novelist
 Shambhoo Nath Bhatt Haleem, Indian, Kashmiri-language poet and children's author
 Sarachchandra Muktibodh (died 1984), Indian, Marathi-language poet and novelist
 Shrikrishna Powale (died 1974), Indian, Marathi-language poet in the "Sthandil" Cult of Kusumagraj and Kant
 Sugan Ahuja (died 1966), Indian, Sindhi-language poet and short-story writer

Deaths
Birth years link to the corresponding "[year] in poetry" article (Indian poets listed by first name, when listed alphabetically, whether or not it is a surname):
 January 13 – Francis William Bourdillon, 68, British poet and translator
 February 15 – Akbar Allahabadi, 74, Indian, Urdu-language poet known for his satire
 April 21 – Rosa Mulholland, Lady Gilbert (born 1841), Irish novelist, short-story writer and poet
 May 26 – Donald Evans (born 1884), American poet, publisher, music critic and journalist
 June 18 – G. H. Gibson, "Ironbark" (born 1846), Australian
 August 7 – Alexander Blok, 40, Russian poet known for his lyrics
 circa August 25 – Nikolay Gumilyov, 35, Russian poet and former husband of Russian poet Anna Akhmatova (executed – see Events, above)
 September 2 – Henry Austin Dobson, 61 (born 1840), English poet and essayist
 September 11 – Subramania Bharati (born 1882), Indian, Tamil-language writer, poet, journalist, Indian independence activist and social reformer, also writing Indian poetry in English
 September 13 – James Hebblethwaite (born 1857), English-born Australian poet, teacher and clergyman
 November 21 – Ernest Myers, 77, English poet and classicist
 Also:
 Va. Ba. Patavardhan (born 1870), Indian, Marathi-language critic and poet

Awards and honors
 Pulitzer Prize for Poetry: no award given

See also

 Poetry
 List of years in poetry

Notes

Poetry
20th-century poetry